The 42nd Royal Tank Regiment (42 RTR) was an armoured regiment of the British Army from 1938 until 1956. It was part of the Royal Tank Regiment, itself part of the Royal Armoured Corps.

Mobilisation 

The unit was formed on 1 November 1938 by converting the 7th (23rd London) Battalion, East Surrey Regiment, a Territorial Army (TA) infantry battalion, into a tank unit. For a short while it was 42nd (7th (23rd London) Battalion, East Surrey Regiment) Battalion of the Royal Tank Corps before the corps was redesignated the Royal Tank Regiment in 1939.

World War II 
The regiment was mobilised on the outbreak of war on 3 September 1939 as part of 21st Army Tank Brigade, composed of three TA battalions of the Royal Tank Regiment.

The unit formed part of 1st Army Tank Brigade in 1941–42, serving with it in the Western Desert Campaign including the Second Battle of El Alamein.

For the invasion of Northern Europe in 1944, it was equipped with Canal Defence Light Grant tanks. These were not used in battle.

Postwar 
From 1947, when the TA was reconstituted, the regiment was in 22nd Armoured Brigade under the 56th (London) Infantry Division.

In 1956, the regiment was converted back to infantry, becoming the 23rd London again.

Notes

References

External links 
 Merseyside RTR (Brian Gill's website)
 Land Forces of Britain, the Empire and Commonwealth – Regiments.org (archive site)
 Graham Watson, The Territorial Army 1947

Royal Tank Regiment
Military units and formations in Wandsworth
Military units and formations in London
Military units and formations established in 1938
Military units and formations disestablished in 1956
1938 establishments in the United Kingdom
1956 disestablishments in the United Kingdom